The  Holden HG is an automobile which was produced by Holden in Australia between 1970 and 1971. It was marketed under Belmont, Kingswood, Premier, Brougham and Monaro model names.

Introduction
The Holden HG range was introduced on 26 July 1970, replacing the Holden HT series which had been in production since May 1969. Changes from the previous model included new grilles and body decorations as well as new safety features, colours and trim designs. All V8-engined models were now fitted with improved disc brakes and the suspension system of the Monaro GTS was modified for greater comfort.

Model range 
The mainstream HG series was offered in four-door sedan and five-door station wagon body styles in three trim levels.
 Belmont sedan 
 Belmont station wagon 
 Kingswood sedan 
 Kingswood station wagon 
 Premier sedan 
 Premier station wagon 

The Brougham, which used a body with an extended boot, was available in one model only.
 Brougham sedan 

The Monaro was offered in three two-door coupe models
 Monaro coupe 
 Monaro GTS coupe 
 Monaro GTS 350 coupe 

Commercial vehicle derivatives were available in two-door coupe utility and two-door panel van body styles.
 Belmont utility 
 Belmont panel van 
 Kingswood utility

Engines and transmissions
A new three-speed "Tri-Matic" automatic transmission was offered for the first time on the full-size Holden range. The "Tri-Matic" was standard on Premier and Brougham models, and offered as an option on all other models excepting the Monaro GTS 350.

Production
The HG range was replaced by the Holden HQ series in July 1971, production having totaled 155,787 units. In total, 6,147 Monaros were produced.

Export
The HG was also sold in South Africa, as the Chevrolet Kommando, Constantia, or El Camino bakkie (pickup). The El Camino sold very well, leaving GM South Africa with no more trucks but a surplus of passenger car parts in early 1972, when the succeeding HQ series was already on its way. The solution was to use up material for 3400 Constantias and Kommandos to build El Camino pickup trucks. These hybrids had considerably better equipment than the regular utility, and proved very popular with consumers, allowing GMSA to make a small profit on the entire deal.

References 

Cars of Australia
Holden vehicles by series
Cars introduced in 1970
Cars discontinued in 1971